For the Rowing competition at the 1986 Asian Games in Misari Regatta, South Korea, men's and women's singles, doubles, and fours competed from September 22 to September 25.

Medalists

Men

Women

Medal table

References 
 New Straits Times, September 26, 1986

External links 
 Olympic Council of Asia

 
1986 Asian Games events
1986
Asian Games
1986 Asian Games